The Human Rights Act 2003 (c 12) (Act) is an Act of the Legislative Assembly of Nunavut, the majority of which came into effect on November 5, 2004. The stated purposes of the Act are "to acknowledge within the framework of Inuit Qaujimajatuqangit that the Government, all public agencies, boards and commissions and all persons in Nunavut have the responsibility to guarantee that every individual in Nunavut is afforded an equal opportunity to enjoy a full and productive life and that failure to provide equality of opportunity threatens the development and well-being of all persons in the community." The Act explicitly does not affect any protections provided for by the Nunavut Land Claims Agreement. A notable achievement of this legislation was to end Nunavut's status as the only jurisdiction in Canada without protections for gay, lesbian and bisexual residents against discrimination.

Provisions 
The Human Rights Act 2003 makes it unlawful to discriminate in certain areas (such as employment, the provision of goods and services and tenancy) on the grounds of "race, colour, ancestry, ethnic origin, citizenship, place of origin, creed, religion, age, disability, sex, sexual orientation, marital status, family status, pregnancy, lawful source of income and a conviction for which a pardon has been granted." The Act also makes it unlawful to harass another person on the basis of such grounds or publish any material expressing discrimination or implying discrimination against an individual or class of individuals.

The Act also established Nunavut Human Rights Tribunal, located in Coral Harbour. Members of the Tribunal are appointed by the Commissioner of Nunavut in Executive Council to serve a term of four years each. Terms may be renewed by the Commissioner in Executive Council, with no term limit. Any person so aggrieved under the Act may file a notification with the Tribunal within two years of any alleged contravention of the Human Rights Act. The Tribunal may make an order in line with s. 34(3) of the Act; such orders are binding on a person as would orders of courts.

Controversy 
The proposed Human Rights Act attracted criticism from both progressives and conservatives prior to its passage, with progressives dismayed that the Bill, unlike similar legislation in the Northwest Territories, did not recognise gender identity as a protected grounds, and conservative MLAs attempting to remove references to sexual orientation as a protected grounds in the Bill.

The day after the passage of the law, a spokeswoman for Iqaluit Pride & Friends of Pride, an LGBT advocacy organisation, expressed disappointment that the Act did not include any reference to gender identity to protect transgender people from discrimination. While the group acknowledged that courts had already recognised transgender people as protected from discrimination under the grounds of sex, the spokeswoman pointed to similar legislation enacted in the Northwest Territories that referred to gender identity as a model.

On the night the Bill was passed into law, Patterk Netser, the member for Nanulik, moved a motion to strike the words 'sexual orientation' from the list of protected grounds, as many members had concerns that the Bill would affect the status of same-sex marriage in Nunavut. According to Paul Okalik, then the Premier of Nunavut, if this motion had passed, the federal government would not have provided Nunavut's Human Rights Tribunal with the ability to adjudicate disputes - protection of gay, lesbian and bisexual Nunavummiut was a condition of the government granting this ability. Opponents of this motion claimed that such an action would violate Section Fifteen of the Canadian Charter of Rights and Freedoms, and made reference to a Supreme Court of Alberta case in which the Supreme Court read protection from discrimination on the grounds of sexual orientation into similar Alberta legislation without explicit reference to said grounds on the basis that to not do so would be a Charter violation. The motion failed in the Legislative Assembly on the night of the Bill's passage with six in favour, nine opposed and one abstention.

See also 
 Canadian Charter of Rights and Freedoms
 LGBT rights in Canada
 Hate speech laws in Canada

References 

Government of Nunavut
Nunavut law
Human rights legislation in Canada
2003 in Canadian law
2003 establishments in Nunavut